Manning (a.k.a. Mannion, Manning) is a family name.

Origin and meaning

Manning is from an old Norse word — manningi — meaning a brave or valiant man; and one of the first forms of the name was Mannin; another cartography was Mannygn. One historian gives a Saxon origin for the family, which he calls "ancient and noble". According to him, Manning was the name of a town in Saxony, and from it the surname sprang.

Other historians make Mannheim, Germany, the cradle of the family, and begin its history with Ranulph, or Rudolph de Manning, Count Palatine, who, having married Elgida, aunt to King Harold I of England, had a grant of land in Kent, England. His name is also written de Mannheim — Rudolph de Mannheim. His place in Kent was Downe Court, and there the Mannings have been a power ever since. Simon de Manning, a grandson of Rudolph, was the first of the English barons to take up the cross and go forth to the Holy Wars. He was a companion of King Richard I of England, and was knighted on the battlefield. He was Lord of the Manor of Kevington, and the area now called Berry's Green. We can easily see where the cross of the coat of arms comes from. At Downe Court these arms are seen graven upon tombstones of the Mannings. By the thirteenth century the family was well represented in over a score of countries and several towns bear their name — Manningham, Bradford, and Mannington, Norfolk. The surname Manning is also an English patronymic name, being one of those names derived from the first name of a father. In this case it is derived from the old English personal name Manning and simply denotes 'son of Manning', while Manning itself may derive from the old Norse name Menning, meaning 'able'.

Early recorded English instances of the name includes a reference to one Mannicus in the Domesday Book of 1086 and Algarus Manningestepsune in 1130, mentioned in Ekwall's "Early London Personal Names". Seaman Lilius Manning appears in the Pipe Rolls for Essex in 1181 and Ainulf Manning in the Pipe Rolls for Kent in 1190.

The surname Manning is on the record in Ireland from the seventeenth century and is most numerous today in the counties Cork and Dublin. Although it is essentially an English surname, Manning has occasionally been used as a synonym of the Gaelic surname Ó Mainnín and that, for example, Cornet John Manning of O'Neill's dragons in King James II's Irish army, was an Ó Mainnín.

Others trace the origins of the name to Ireland: Ó Mainnín (anglicized Mannion) is the name of a Galway family who were formerly chiefs of Soghain (in what is now Ireland), a district nearly co-extensive with the barony of Tiaquin. Ó Mainnín, King of Soghain, is mentioned in the Chronicon Scotorum in the year 1135, and a latter chief died at the Second Battle of Athenry in 1316.

The Mannings continued to form a distinct clan down to the time of James I of England. The chief resided at Menlough Castle, in the parish of Killascobe, Galway. In 1617, Aedh Ó Mainnín (Hugh O'Mannin) surrendered his estates, but a small portion was restored under the Act of Settlement in 1676. The name is still common in Galway and Roscommon, and has spread into other parts of Ireland.

People

 Al G. Manning  (1927–2006), American occultist
 Anne Manning (racewalker) (born 1959), Australian racewalker
 Aubrey Manning (1930–2018), English zoologist and broadcaster
 Barbara Manning (born 1964), American indie rock musician
 Bernard Manning (1930–2007), British comedian
 Bernard Manning (singer) (c. 1886–1962), in England and Australia
 Blanche M. Manning (1934–2020), American judge
 Brandon Manning (born 1990), Canadian professional ice hockey player
 Brennan Manning, born Richard Francis Xavier Manning, (1934–2013), American author of The Ragamuffin Gospel
 Brian Manning (disambiguation), several people including:
 Brian Manning (historian) (1927–2004), British historian
 Brian G. W. Manning (1926–2011), British astronomer
 Brian Manning (American football) (born 1975), American football wide receiver
 Brian Manning (trade unionist and activist) (1932–2013), Australian activist
 Caroline Joyce Manning (1909–2000), British campaigner
 Catherine Lemmon Manning (1881–1957), of Washington, D.C.
 Chelsea Manning (born 1987), U.S. Army intelligence analyst, convicted of leaking classified materials to WikiLeaks
 Clarence Manning (1893–1972), U.S. Slavicist
 Daniel Manning (1831–1887), U.S. Secretary of the Treasury under Cleveland
 David Manning (born 1949), British diplomat
 Dick Manning (1912–1991), American songwriter
 Don Manning (politician) (1965–2020), American politician
 Dorothy Manning (1919–2012), New Zealand artist
 Emily Manning (1845–1890), Australian journalist and writer
 Ernest Manning (1908–1996), Canadian politician
 Edward Manning (disambiguation)
 Elizabeth Manning (disambiguation)
 Frankie Manning (born 1914), American dancer
 Frederic Manning (1882–1935), Australian poet and novelist
 Geoff Manning (1926–2018), South Australian historian
 Marie Manning (murderer) (died 1849), British murderer
 Guy Manning, British musician
 Harvey Manning (1925–2006), American author and hiking advocate
 Henry Manning (disambiguation), several people including
 Henry Manning (spy), spy in the exiled court of Charles II at Cologne and Brussels
 Henry Manning (politician) (1877–1963), Australian lawyer and politician
 Henry Edward Manning (1808–1892), English Roman Catholic Archbishop of Westminster
 Henry J. Manning (1859–?), U.S. Navy sailor and Medal of Honor recipient
 Hugh Manning (1920–2004), British actor
 Jack Manning (actor) (1916–2009), American actor
 James David Manning (born 1947), American pastor
 Jane Manning (1938–2021), English soprano singer
 Jeff Manning, (born 1971), American author and entrepreneur
 Jessie Wilson Manning (born 1855), American author and lecturer
 Joanne Manning, American laser scientist
 John Manning (disambiguation), several people including:
 John Manning, co-founder of the Atlantic Brass Quintet
 John Manning Jr. (1830–1899), U.S. Representative from North Carolina
 John Manning (footballer) (1940–2021), English football player
 John Manning (journalist) (died 1868), New Zealand newspaper editor
 John Manning (rugby union), Australian rugby player
 John B. Manning (1833–1908), mayor of Buffalo, New York
 John Charles Manning (born 1962), South African botanist
 John Edmondson Manning (1848–1910), English Unitarian minister
 John F. Manning (born 1961), Harvard Law School professor
 John J. Manning (born 1942), Frontiersman, Lawman
 John Lawrence Manning (1816–1889), Governor of South Carolina, 1852–1854
 Katy Manning (born 1949), British actress
 Laurence Manning (born 1899), Canadian science fiction author
 Marie Manning (murderer) (died 1849), Swiss murderer
 Matt Manning (born 1998), American baseball player
 Matthew Manning (born 1955), British author and healer, alleged to have psychic and psychokinetic abilities
 Maurice Manning (born 1943), Irish politician
 Maurice Manning (poet) (born 1966), American poet
 Michael Manning (disambiguation)
 Mick Manning (born 1959), British children's author and illustrator
 Mike Manning (actor) (born 1987), American activist and actor
 Nelson H. Manning (1832–?), American politician
 Nick Manning (born 1967), American porn star
 Orlando H. Manning (1847–1909), American politician
 Owen Manning (1721–1801) English clergyman, antiquarian and historian
 Padraig Gearr Ó Mannin (fl. 1798), United Irishman
 Patrick Manning (1946–2016), Prime Minister and Minister of Trinidad and Tobago
 Paul Manning (disambiguation), several people including:
Paul Manning (police officer) (born 1973), police officer who worked undercover
Paul Manning (journalist) (died 1995), American broadcast journalist
Paul Manning (cyclist) (born 1974), British track and road racing cyclist
Paul Manning (ice hockey) (born 1979), Canadian ice hockey player
Paul Manning (TV producer) (1959–2005), American television producer
 Peter Manning (disambiguation), several people including:
Peter Manning, British violinist
 Peter K. Manning (born 1940), American sociologist
Peter Manning (footballer) (born 1946), Australian footballer
Pete Manning (gridiron football) (1937–2019), American and Canadian footballer
 Phil Manning (musician) (born 1948), Australian blues musician
 Preston Manning (born 1942), Canadian politician and son of Ernest Manning
 Randolph Manning (1804–1864), American jurist
 Raymond B. Manning (1934–2000), American carcinologist
 Richard F. Manning (born 1966), New Zealand academic and Treaty of Waitangi educator
 Robert Manning (disambiguation)
 Roger Manning (disambiguation)
 Scott Manning (1958–2006), football player and plane pilot
 Sidney E. Manning (1892–1960), American Medal of Honor recipient
 Stuart Manning (born 1979), English actor and model
 Taryn Manning (born 1978), American actress
 Terry Manning, music producer and engineer
 Timothy Manning (1909–1989), Cardinal Archbishop of Los Angeles
 Thomas Manning (disambiguation), various people
 Van H. Manning (1839–1892), American politician and soldier
 Van H. Manning (1861–1932), American engineer
 Wayne Eyer Manning (1899–2004), American botanist
 William Manning (British politician) (1763–1835), Governor of the Bank of England
 William Manning, co-founder of Manning & Napier (an investment management firm), whose name is reflected in the Manning rule
 William Montagu Manning (1811–1895), English-born Australian politician and judge
 William Thomas Manning (1866–1949), bishop of New York

Sports
 The Manning family of American football:
 Archie Manning (born 1949), quarterback and family patriarch
 Cooper Manning (born 1974), oldest son of Archie; wide receiver, later businessman and sports commentator
 Peyton Manning (born 1976), middle son of Archie; quarterback
 Eli Manning (born 1981), youngest son of Archie; quarterback
 Arch Manning (born 2005), son of Cooper; quarterback
 Curtis Manning (lacrosse), (born 1987), Canadian lacrosse player
 Danieal Manning (born 1982), American football player
 Danny Manning (born 1966), American basketball player and coach
 Darren Manning (born 1975), English racecar driver
 Don Manning, American football player
 Ed Manning (1943–2011), American basketball player and coach; father of Danny Manning
 Harold Manning (1909–2003), American steeplechase runner
 Jack Manning (baseball) (1853–1929), American baseball player
 Jim Manning (baseball, born 1862) (1862–1929), American baseball player, manager and team owner
 Jim Manning (pitcher) (1943–2020), American baseball player
 John Manning (footballer) (born 1940), English (soccer) footballer
 Madeline Manning (born 1948), American middle-distance runner
 Phil Manning (footballer) (1906–1930), Australian rules footballer
 Rick Manning (born 1954), American baseball player
 Ricky Manning, Jr. (born 1980), American football player
 Rosie Manning (born 1950), American football player
 Rube Manning (1883–1930), American baseball player
 Scott Manning (1958–2006), football player and plane pilot
 Paul Mannion (born 1993), Gaelic football player
 Trevor Manning (1945), New Zealand Olympic Gold Medallist in Field Hockey

Fictional
 Craig Manning, character on Degrassi: The Next Generation
 Curtis Manning (24 character), character on 24
 Danielle Manning, character on One Life to Live
 David Manning (fictitious writer)
 Jack Manning (One Life to Live)#Jack Manning, character on One Life to Live
 Meg Manning, character on Veronica Mars
 Sam Manning (One Life to Live), character on One Life to Live
 Sarah Manning, character on Orphan Black
 Kira Manning, character on Orphan Black
 Starr Manning, character on One Life to Live
 Téa Delgado, Téa Delgado Manning, character on One Life to Live
 Todd Manning, character on One Life to Live

References

English-language surnames
Surnames of English origin
Surnames of Irish origin
Anglicised Irish-language surnames